Sekhar Menon is an Indian Musician and Actor primarily working in Malayalam cinema. He is a well known disc jockey too. He has deejayed at over 500 stages, mainly in Kerala.

Personal life

Sekhar has a degree in Sound Engineering from Chennai. He is married to Maya on 16 January 2008 and have a daughter named Kaamaakhya born in March 2013.
He also has another daughter named Maathangi born in Aug 2017. He currently resides in Eroor, Tripunitura with his mother, wife & children.

Acting career 

Sekhar made his debut in acting in 2012, in the Aashiq Abu movie, Da Thadiya, as the lead. He was the main antagonist in 2014 movie Gangster. He also appeared in notable roles in few other movies.

DJ

Sekhar started off Deejaying in a small pub called Formula 1 in 2001, which was his first full-time job as a DJ. But since 1998, Sekhar had been an ardent fan of funk, hip-hop, house, soul and R&B, genres that weren't very popular commercially. He also watched the top guys in the business with keen interest. "I used to attend all the gigs of veterans Johnson, Vishnu, Suraj and Jakes," Sekhar says. It was not easy to get music, yet Sekhar did his homework. Hours of research in net cafes, listening to different kinds of stuff being played, calling up friends abroad who helped him keep international trends kept him updated. He has played at all the clubs in the city and is currently at Ava Lounge (Dream Hotel). He has never considered migrating to bigger cities which have wilder parties. For the "Kochi boy" loves his hometown, cherishes his visits to the temple and dreams of setting up a sound studio, where he can immerse himself in music production and teach deejaying.

Sekhar has previously worked with Aashiq Abu in his offbeat blockbuster ‘Salt N' Pepper', for which he did the official remix of rock band Avial's track ‘Aanakallan'.

Filmography

As actor

Discography

References 

21st-century Indian male actors
1983 births
Living people
Male actors from Kochi
Male actors in Malayalam cinema
Indian male film actors